Golden Memorial State Park is a state park in the U.S. state of Mississippi located off Mississippi Highway 492 approximately  east of Walnut Grove.

Activities and amenities
The park features fishing on a  spring-fed lake, 14 campsites, 2 cabins, picnic area, and a nature trail.

References

External links
Golden Memorial State Park Mississippi Department of Wildlife, Fisheries, and Parks

State parks of Mississippi
Protected areas of Leake County, Mississippi